The Roman School was a musical movement in the 16th and 17th century Rome

Roman School may also refer to:

 School in ancient Rome, see Education in Ancient Rome
 Scuola Romana (Roman School), a 20th-century art movement 
 Roman School, a methodological approach to the history of religion that was prominent in mid-20th century Italy